Shelby Rogers was the defending champion, having won the event in 2012, but lost to Storm Sanders in the quarterfinals.

Nicole Gibbs won the title, defeating Ivana Lisjak in the final, 6–1, 6–4.

Seeds

Main draw

Finals

Top half

Bottom half

References 
 Main draw

Yakima Regional Hospital Challenger - Singles